Indrajeet (Sati Sulochana) is a 1961 Telugu-language Hindu mythological film, based on the life of Indrajit from the epic Ramayana, produced by S. Rajinikanth, D. V. Subba Rao and Kancharla Madhava Rao under the Srikanth Productions banner and directed by S. Rajinikanth. It stars N. T. Rama Rao and Anjali Devi, with music composed by T. V. Raju. Sati Sulochana and Pendli Pilupu were released on the same day, both starred by NTR. The film is dubbed into Bengali in 1979 as Meghnad Badh/Vadh

Plot
The film begins with the birth of Ravana's (S. V. Ranga Rao) son Meghanada when Ravana commands all the nine planets to be constellations in such a position so that he could become a universal hero. But Shani disobeys Ravana's order for which he amputates him. Indra (Mikkilineni) learns regarding the bravery of the child; he sends his followers to capture him, but he defeats them and thrown back. Now Meghanada takes a vow to win over Indra, for which he moves to penance to get a boon of immortality. Meghanada (N. T. Rama Rao) performs a huge penance for Lord Brahma, gets a boon to Meghanada that he will die only in the hands of a person who stays awake for 14 years, without taking food & water and he must be a bachelor with the wife. After that, Meganadha declares war against Indra, as he is defeated, he rushes to Nagaloka and takes the protection of Adiseshu. Meghanada follows him where he gets acquainted with Adiseshu's daughter Sulochana (Anjali Devi), both of them fell in love. But Adiseshu did not agree for their alliance, the war begins between them and Adiseshu is defeated where he too takes a vow that he will definitely eliminate him for which even he is ready to take rebirth. Meghanada arrests Indra moves towards Lanka along with Sulochana and throws Indra at the feet of his father. There onwards, Meghanada is called as Indrajith. Indrajith & Sulochana get married, lived happily for some time after that a dispute arises because she is a disciple of Lord Vishnu, which is not liked by Ravana & Indrajit. So, Indrajit starts harassing her to stop her prayers.

Years roll by, Lord Vishnu (Kanta Rao) takes the avatar of Lord Rama and Adisheshu also borns along with him as Lakshmana (Ramakrishna) to take revenge against Indrajith. Ravana captures Seeta (Rajasri) and keeps her in Lanka. Lord Hanuman, in search of Seeta, reaches Lanka and destroys the Ashokavanam where Indrajit arrests him through Bhramaastra. Hanuman burns out Lanka returns to Rama and gives information regarding Seeta. The war begins, one by one, Ravana's soldiers are getting killed by Rama; Indrajith, being a magician, wants to stop Rama and creates an illusion that he has killed Seeta when Rama faints up. Now Lakshmana encounters Indrajith in the battlefield. The first day of the war, Lakshmana was defeated by Indrajith by using Nagastram (Snake Bomb), by which he is completely poisoned when Hanuman brings Sanjeevani from the Himalayas and saves him. After recovery, Lakshmana finds that Indrajith is performing a Yaaga to become immortal so he must be killed before it is completed. On the other side, his wife Sulochana is performing a Vratham, which is protecting her husband. Lakshmana destroys the Yaaga, at the same time, Ravana stops Sulochana's prayers, at that moment, Lakshmana decapitates Indrajith. Knowing this, Sulochana bursts out and reaches to the battlefield where she finds her husband's body without a head. But through her devotional power, she gets back her husband's head and completes her Vratham after that, both die. Finally, the movie ends with their souls reaching heaven.

Cast
N. T. Rama Rao as Indrajit / Meghanadhudu
Anjali Devi as Sulochana 
S. V. Ranga Rao as Ravana
Kanta Rao as Lord Vishnu / Lord Rama
V. Nagayya as Valmiki
Rajanala as Yama Dharma Raju
Ramakrishna as Lakshmana
Ramana Reddy as Gajasura
Chalam as Narada Maharshi
Mikkilineni as Indra
Rajasree as Goddess Lakshmi / Goddess Sita
Sandhya as Mandodari
Mohana
Kamala Kumari

Soundtrack

Music composed by T. V. Raju. Lyrics were written by Samudrala Sr.

Remakes
It was made into Hindi movie in 1969, Directed by S.N. Tripathi starring Anita Guha, Prithviraj Kapoor. It was made into a movie titled Sati Naag Kanya in both 1956 and remade again in 1983, both being directed by Babubhai Mistry.

References

Hindu mythological films
Films scored by T. V. Raju
Films based on the Ramayana